José Batlle Perdomo Teixeira (born January 5, 1965) is a Uruguayan former footballer who played as a midfielder.

Born in Salto, he started his career with Club Atlético Peñarol in 1983, being later noted in 1989 by Genoa head coach Franco Scoglio during a South-American scouting visit, being signed by the rossoblu together with fellow Uruguayans Carlos "Pato" Aguilera and Rubén Paz. Perdomo, who was expected to be a mainstay within the Genoa midfield line, played 25 unimpressive matches, being remembered only for his lack of pace and acceleration, as well as his excessive playing aggressivity. His poor performances later led Vujadin Boškov, head coach of crosstown rivals Sampdoria, to one of his best famous quotes, declared just before the 1989–90 city derby:
"If I unleash my dog, it plays better than Perdomo."

He was sold to Spanish side Real Betis for the 1990–91, where he made just six appearances, scoring one goal. He moved to Gimnasia y Esgrima La Plata one year later, and retired in 1994 after a season with Peñarol.

References

External links 
Profile at LFP.es
Profile (in Spanish)

1965 births
Living people
Uruguayan footballers
Uruguay under-20 international footballers
Uruguay international footballers
1990 FIFA World Cup players
1987 Copa América players
1989 Copa América players
Association football midfielders
Peñarol players
Uruguayan Primera División players
Real Betis players
La Liga players
Genoa C.F.C. players
Serie A players
Coventry City F.C. players
Club de Gimnasia y Esgrima La Plata footballers
Expatriate footballers in Argentina
Expatriate footballers in Spain
Expatriate footballers in England
Expatriate footballers in Italy
Uruguayan expatriate sportspeople in Argentina
Uruguayan expatriate sportspeople in England
Uruguayan expatriate sportspeople in Spain
Uruguayan expatriate sportspeople in Italy
Uruguayan expatriate footballers
Uruguayan football managers
Footballers from Salto, Uruguay
Copa América-winning players